Sara Cognuck is a climate activist from Costa Rica.

Early life and education 
In her early life, Cognuck lived in Peñas Blancas. She currently lives in Esparza.  She is graduate of University of Costa Rica.

Activism 
She started her activism when she was 15 years old.  One of her activism started on 2015 or 2016 when she joined National Council of Young Persons of Costa Rica which being part of movement to include climate action in the Public Policy of the Young Person 2020–2024. Cognuck was also a coordinator of Local Conference of Youth (LCOY)  which is an event precede COP 25 and part of Youth Constituency of the United Nations Framework Convention on Climate Change which joined by 70 youth. She is also one of youth representative for Declaration on Children, Youth and Climate Action.

Reference 

Women environmentalists
Youth climate activists
Climate activists